Halja Klaar (17 December 1930 – 20 February 2021) was an Estonian film artist.

Biography
From 1957 to 1986, she worked as a production artist at Tallinnfilm. She worked on 20 feature films, including Dangerous Curves, Vallatud kurvid, and others.

Halja Klaar died on 20 February 2021 at the age of 90.

Awards
 Merited Artist of the Estonian SSR (1982)
 Lifetime Achievement Award of the Estonian Cultural Endowment's Audiovisual Arts Endowment (2016)

References

1930 births
2021 deaths
20th-century Estonian women artists
21st-century Estonian women artists
Estonian Academy of Arts alumni
People from Antsla
Place of death missing